The 1979 Sam Houston State Bearkats football team represented Sam Houston State University as a member of the Lone Star Conference (LSC) during the 1979 NAIA Division I football season. Led by second-year head coach Melvin Brown, the Bearkats compiled an overall record of 1–9 with a mark of 0–7 in conference play, and finished eighth in the LSC.

Schedule

References

Sam Houston State
Sam Houston Bearkats football seasons
Sam Houston State Bearkats football